The Senones or Senonii (Gaulish: "the ancient ones") were an ancient Gallic tribe dwelling in the Seine basin, around present-day Sens, during the Iron Age and the Roman period.

Part of the Senones settled in the Italian peninsula, where they ousted the Umbrians between Ariminum (modern-day Rimini) and Ancona. They are described in classical sources as the leaders of the Gallic war-band that captured Rome during the Battle of the Allia in 390 BCE. They remained a constant threat until Rome eventually subjugated them in 283 BCE, after which they disappeared from Italy.

Name 
They are mentioned as Sḗnōnes (Σήνωνες) and Sḗnōnas (Σήνωνας) by Polybius (2nd c. BC), Senonii by Caesar (mid-1st c. BC), Sénnōnes (Σέννωνες) by Diodorus Siculus (1st c. BC), Sénōnes (Σένωνες) by Strabo (early 1st c. AD), Senones by Pliny (1st c. AD), Sénones (Σένονες) by Ptolemy (2nd c. AD), and as Senones by Ammnianus (4th c. AD).

The Gaulish ethnonym Senones is generally interpreted as meaning 'the ancient ones', by deriving the name from the Proto-Celtic root *sen- ('old'; cf. Old Irish sen; Middle Welsh hen 'old') extended by the suffix -on-es. Pierre-Yves Lambert has also proposed an etymology from the root *sen(H)-, meaning 'to gain, vanquish'. In ancient times, Servius compared the name to the Greek ξενός ('guest-friend, host, stranger').

The city of Sens, attested in the 4th century AD as Senonas oppidum ('oppidum of the Senones'), is named after the Gallic tribe.

Geography 
The Senones of Gauls dwelled around their capital Agedincum (present-day Sens).

History

In Gallia Cisalpina
They joined Bellovesus' migrations towards Italy, together with the Aeduii, Ambarri, Arverni, Aulerci, and Carnutes.

In 400 BCE, they crossed the Alps and, driving out the Umbrians, settled on the east coast of Italy. Their territory spanned from Forlì to Ancona and Terni, in the Ager Gallicus. They founded the town of Sena Gallica (Senigallia), which became their capital. In 391 BCE, under the chieftain Brennus, they invaded Etruria and besieged Clusium. The Clusines appealed to Rome for aid. The Romans provided support, which constituted a violation of the law of nations. The ensuing war resulted in the defeat of the Romans at the Battle of the Allia (18 July 390 BCE) and the sacking of Rome.

For more than 100 years the Senones were engaged in hostilities with the Romans, until they were finally subdued (283 BCE) by P. Cornelius Dolabella and driven out of their territory. Nothing more was heard of them in Italy. It is possible that they joined with Gallic tribes who spread themselves throughout the lands of the Danube, Macedonia, and Asia Minor. A Roman colony was established at Sena, called Sena Gallica (currently Senigallia) to distinguish it from Sena Julia (Siena) in Etruria.

In Gallia Transalpina
A branch of the Senones (or a different tribe of the same name) settling the district which now includes the departments of Seine-et-Marne, Loiret and Yonne from 53–51 BCE were engaged in hostilities with Julius Caesar brought about by their expulsion of Cavarinus, whom he had appointed their king. In 51 BCE, a Senonian named Drappes threatened the Provincia, but was captured and starved himself to death. From this time the Gallic Senones disappear from history. In later times, they were included in Gallia Lugdunensis. Their chief towns were Agedincum (later Senones, whence Sens),  (Melun; according to A. Holder, Meudon), and Vellaunodunum (site uncertain).

References

Bibliography

External links
 

 
Historical Celtic peoples
Gauls
Senones
History of le Marche
Gallia Narbonensis